Rascal Flatts was an American country music group founded in 1999 by Gary LeVox, Jay DeMarcus, and Joe Don Rooney. Signed to Lyric Street Records until 2010, the band released ten studio albums plus a greatest hits package, the first six on the Lyric Street Records label, the last four on Big Machine Records. Their highest-certified albums are Feels Like Today and Me and My Gang, which are both certified 5× Platinum. Except for their 2000 self-titled debut and 2017's Back to Us, all of the group's albums have reached No. 1 on the Top Country Albums chart.

The trio released 40 singles, 14 of which reached No. 1 on the US Billboard Hot Country Songs charts and five of which have reached No. 1 on the Canadian country charts. Their rendition of "Bless the Broken Road" is their longest-lasting number one single at five weeks, while their cover of "What Hurts the Most" is also a number one on the Hot Adult Contemporary Tracks charts. The latter song is the group's highest-peaking entry on the Billboard Hot 100, reaching number 6. Their second-highest Hot 100 peak is the number 7 "Life Is a Highway", which the group recorded for the soundtrack to the Pixar animated movie Cars; it reached No. 18 on the country charts based on unsolicited airplay.

In July 2010, the group signed with Big Machine Records, and released a new album, Nothing Like This, on November 16, 2010. Their eighth studio album, Changed, was released in April 2012. Their ninth studio album, Rewind, was released on May 13, 2014. Their tenth and final studio album, Back to Us, was released on May 19, 2017.

Rascal Flatts has sold over 27 million albums and 33.7 million digital downloads since their debut in 2000.

Studio albums

2000s

2010s

Christmas albums

Compilation albums

Extended plays

Live albums

Singles

2000s

2010s and 2020s

Promotional singles

Guest singles

Other charted songs

Other appearances

Videography

DVDs

Music videos
Most of Rascal Flatts' singles have also featured music videos, which have aired on the television networks CMT and GAC. "Life Is a Highway", which was not officially released to country radio, also featured a video that aired on these networks.

Four album cuts have been made into music videos: "My Worst Fear" (from Melt), "Here's to You" (from Feels Like Today), "He Ain't the Leaving Kind" (from Me and My Gang), and their cover of "I'll Be Home for Christmas" (from Greatest Hits Volume 1).

Guest appearances

Notes

References

Country music discographies
Discographies of American artists